Schnitt (German: Editing), also called Schnitt - Das Filmmagazin, was a German language film magazine founded by Nikolaj Nikitin and Oliver Baumgarten in Germany. The magazine was headquartered in Cologne and was published between 1995 and 2013.

History and profile
Schnitt was started by Nikolaj Nikitin and Oliver Baumgarten in 1995. Baumgarten was also the editor-in-chief of the magazine from its start in 1995 to 2010. The headquarters of the magazine was in Cologne. The magazine, which was published four times a year, focused on the effects of the films on the viewer and on the technical features of the films. It also featured articles about the correlations between films and other media and arts, including painting as well as on the history of films, film theory, short films and major figures in the film industry.

Although Schnitt  was published in German, some of its issues were published both in German and English. The magazine ceased publication in 2013.

See also
List of magazines in Germany

References

External links
 

1995 establishments in Germany
2013 disestablishments in Germany
Cultural magazines published in Germany
Defunct magazines published in Germany
Film magazines
German-language magazines
Magazines established in 1995
Magazines disestablished in 2013
Mass media in Cologne
Quarterly magazines published in Germany